This list of people from Winnipeg includes notable people who were born, raised, or who achieved fame in Winnipeg, Manitoba, Canada.

Artists

 K. C. Adams, contemporary artist
 Joyce Anderson, painter and art teacher
 Eleanor Bond, painter
 Bertram Brooker, abstract painter
 Sheila Butler, contemporary artist
 Charles Comfort, painter
 Roewan Crowe, multi-media artist
 Shawna Dempsey and Lorri Millan, performance artists, authors, video & filmmakers
 Aganetha Dyck, contemporary artist
 Marcel Dzama, contemporary artist 
 Neil Farber, contemporary artist
 LeMoine Fitzgerald, painter
 Lita Fontaine, interdisciplinary artist 
 Étienne Gaboury, architect
 Barb Hunt, contemporary artist 
 Sarah Anne Johnson, contemporary artist 
 Francis Hans Johnston, painter 
 Wanda Koop, interdisciplinary artist
Gweneth Lloyd, choreographer and co-founder of Royal Winnipeg Ballet
 Leo Mol, stained glass artist 
 Kent Monkman, contemporary artist
 Freya Olafson, contemporary artist
 Bev Pike, contemporary artist
 Dominique Rey, contemporary artist
 The Royal Art Lodge, contemporary artists
 Lindsay Shearer-Nelko, choreographer
 Sheila Spence, photographer
 Arnold Spohr, choreographer
 The Steiner Brothers, tap-dancing trio and Mouseketeer Ron Steiner
 Reva Stone, artist
 Diana Thorneycroft, photographer
 Rhayne Vermette, filmmaker
 Diane Whitehouse, painter

Sports persons

Ice hockey

 Reg Abbott
 Jim Agnew
 Clint Albright
 Bill Allum
 Carter Ashton
 Cam Barker
 Andy Bathgate
 Ken Baumgartner
 Paul Baxter
 Gordie Bell
 Joe Bell
 Robert Benson
 Andy Blair
 Lonny Bohonos
 Larry Bolonchuk
 Ryan Bonni
 Dick Bouchard
 Dan Bourbonnais
 Madison Bowey
 Ralph Bowman
 Jack Bownass
 Dustin Boyd
Darren Boyko
Bailey Bram
Rube Brandow
Andy Branigan
Duane Bray
Billy Breen
Delayne Brian
Gerry Brisson
Turk Broda
George Brown
Harold Brown
Larry Brown
Cecil Browne
Ray Brunel
 Ed Bruneteau
 Mud Bruneteau
Barry Brust
Al Buchanan
Bill Burega
Shawn Byram
Walter Byron
Ryan Caldwell
Don Caley
Matt Calvert
Jim Cardiff
Bruce Carmichael
Al Carr
Greg Carroll
Art Chapman
Christian Chartier
Dave Chartier
Brad Chartrand
Wayne Chernecki
Stefan Cherneski
Rich Chernomaz
Ron Chipperfield
Elliot Chorley
Bob Chrystal
Brad Church
Andrew Clark
Kevin Clark
Bobby Clarke
Brian Coates
Delaney Collins
Jim Collins
Red Conn
Jack Connolly
 Cam Connor
Joe Cooper
Riley Cote
Art Coulter
Thomas Coulter
Adam Courchaine
Rosario Couture
 Jimmy Creighton
Jimmy Creighton
Clifford Crowley
Joe Crozier
Wilf Cude
Cory Cyrenne
 Joe Daley
 Kimbi Daniels
 Max Domi
 Jordy Douglas
 Jimmy Dunn
 Mary Dunn
Red Dutton
Cody Eakin
 Joel Edmundson
 Gary Emmons
 Brian Engblom
 Dean Evason
 Bill Ezinicki
 Frank Fredrickson
 Byron Froese
 Owen Fussey
 Herb Gardiner
 Chay Genoway
 Butch Goring
 Cody Glass
 Haldor Halderson
 Al Hamilton
 Travis Hamonic
 Ted Harris
 Andy Hebenton
 Darren Helm
 Phil Hergesheimer
 Wally Hergesheimer
 Bryan Hextall
 Ike Hildebrand
 Cecil Hoekstra
 Quinton Howden
 Dave Hrechkosy
 Ted Irvine
 Seth Jarvis
 Paul Jerrard
 Konrad Johannesson
 Ching Johnson
 Jim Johnson
 Eddie Johnstone
 Mike Keane
 Duncan Keith
 Julian Klymkiw
 Aggie Kukulowicz
 Ed Kullman
 Gord Labossiere
 Max Labovitch
 Gord Lane
 Pete Langelle
 Derek Laxdal
 Jamie Leach
 Mike Leclerc
 Grant Ledyard
 Chuck Lefley
 Brendan Leipsic
 Bob Leiter
 Curtis Leschyshyn
 Odie Lowe
 Brooks Macek
 Bill MacKenzie
 Fred Marples
 Bill Masterton
 Fred Maxwell
 Dunc McCallum
 Kevin McCarthy
 Ab McDonald
 Dylan McIlrath
 Doug McMurdy
 Jacob Micflikier
 Nick Mickoski
 Perry Miller
 Bill Mosienko
 Colton Orr
 Nolan Patrick
 James Patrick
 Steve Patrick
 Johnny Peirson
 Alf Pike
 Ken Reardon
 Terry Reardon
 Billy Reay
 Ryan Reaves
 James Reimer
 Mike Ridley
 Claude C. Robinson, ice hockey executive, inductee into the Hockey Hall of Fame
 Dunc Rousseau
 Terry Sawchuk
 Dave Semenko
 Damon Severson
 Patrick Sharp
 Alex Shibicky
 Ron Shudra
 Warren Skorodenski
 Sami Jo Small
 Art Somers
 Emory Sparrow
 Lorne Stamler
 Wally Stanowski
 Alexander Steen
 Pete Stemkowski
 Blair Stewart
 Mark Stone
 Billy Taylor
 Jimmy Thomson
 Kevin Todd
 Jonathan Toews
 Lindsay Vallis
 Dale Weise
 Duvie Westcott
 Ian White
 Neil Wilkinson
 Carey Wilson
 Allan Woodman
 Bob Woytowich
 Ken Wregget
 Mike Yaschuk
 Travis Zajac
Chick Zamick

Basketball
Emmanuel Akot, college basketball player
Eric Bridgeland, college basketball coach 
Jarred Ogungbemi-Jackson, professional basketball player 
Joey Johnson, wheelchair basketball player 
Todd MacCulloch, NBA center for the Philadelphia 76ers and the New Jersey Nets
Rick McNair, basketball coach and founder of Winnipeg Fringe Festival
Erfan Nasajpour, professional basketball player 
Chad Posthumus, professional basketball player 
Carl Ridd, professional basketball player
Martin Riley, Olympic basketball player 
Daniel Sackey, college basketball player
BT Toews, professional basketball coach and father of Kai Toews
Bob Town, Olympic basketball player 
Joey Vickery, professional basketball player 
Roy Williams, Olympic basketball player 
Malcolm Wiseman, Olympic basketball player

Football

Al Ackland, professional football player
Donovan Alexander, professional football player
Bill Baker, professional football player
Keith Bennett, professional football player
Lorne Benson, professional football player
Mike Benson, professional football player
Andy Bieber, professional football player
Simon Blaszczak, professional football player
Ken Bochen, professional football player
Bill Boivin, professional football player
James Bond, professional football player
Doug Brown, professional football defensive tackle
Brady Browne, professional football player
Jack Bruzell, professional football player
Zac Carlson, professional football player
Jim Carphin, professional football player
Bill Ceretti, professional football player
Walter Chikowski, professional football player
Scott Coe, professional football player
Anthony Coombs, professional football player
Billy Cooper, professional football player
Bruce Covernton, professional football player
Nic Demski, professional football player
Brian Dobie, coach for the University of Manitoba Bisons
George Druxman, professional football player
Leo Ezerins, professional football player
Scott Flagel, professional football player
Jim Furlong, professional football player
Evan Gill, professional football player
Geoff Gray, professional football offensive lineman
Roger Hamelin, professional football player
John Hammond, professional football player
Andrew Harris, professional football player
Ben Hatskin, professional football player
Rod Hill, professional football cornerback 
Israel Idonije, professional football defensive end who led the NFL in blocked punts in 2005, 2006, and 2007
T. J. Jones, professional football player 
Les Lear, professional football player
Cal Murphy, coach, scout, and player 
David Onyemata, first NFL player ever drafted from the University of Manitoba 
Don Oramasionwu, professional football player
T-Dre Player, professional football player
Joe Poplawski, professional football player
Chad Rempel, professional football player
Mike Richardson, professional football player 
Bobby Singh, professional football player 
John Urschel, professional football player and mathematician
Fred Vant Hull, professional football player

Wrestling

Bob Brown, professional wrestler
Kerry Brown, professional wrestler
Don Callis, professional wrestling manager and executive vice president of Impact Wrestling
Tony Condello, professional wrestler and promoter 
Cathy Corino, professional wrestler
Steve Corino, professional wrestler 
Chi Chi Cruz, professional wrestler 
Allison Danger, professional wrestler 
Johnny Devine, professional wrestler 
Paul Diamond, professional wrestler 
Danny Duggan, professional wrestler 
Robert Evans, professional wrestler 
George Gordienko, professional wrestler inducted into the Professional Wrestling Hall of Fame and Museum
David Hohl, professional wrestler 
Ricky Hunter, professional wrestler 
Chris Jericho, WWE legend and lead singer for Fozzy currently signed to All Elite Wrestling
Tom Magee, professional wrestler and bodybuilder 
Kenny Omega, professional wrestler and executive vice president of All Elite Wrestling
Fred Peloquin, professional wrestler 
Roddy Piper, professional wrestler inducted into WWE Hall of Fame
Courtney Rush, professional wrestler 
Sarah Stock, professional wrestler 
Al Tomko, professional wrestler 
The Von Steigers, professional wrestling tag team

Martial arts
Mark Berger, professional judoka
Robin Black, mixed martial artist
Roland Delorme, UFC bantamweight
Joe Doerksen, mixed martial artist 
Baxter Humby, kickboxer 
Brad Katona, UFC bantamweight 
Donny Lalonde, boxer 
Krzysztof Soszynski, UFC heavyweight

Curling
 Dawn Askin
 Kerry Burtnyk
 Cathy Gauthier
 Steve Gould
 Don Duguid
 Randy Dutiaume
 Janet Harvey
 Jennifer Jones
 Jon Mead
 John Morris
 B. J. Neufeld
 Chris Neufeld
 Denni Neufeld
 Jill Officer
 Cathy Overton-Clapham
 Gord Paterson
 Sam Penwarden
 Corinne Peters
 Daley Peters
 Vic Peters
 Kelly Scott
 Jeff Stoughton
 Bob Ursel
 Garry Van Den Berghe
 Ken Watson

Speed skating
 Susan Auch 
 Clara Hughes 
 Cindy Klassen 
Doreen McCannell-Botterill

Golf
George Knudson
Harold Eidsvig
Bill Ezinicki
Dan Halldorson
Nick Taylor

Volleyball
Garth Pischke
Taylor Pischke
Wanda Guenette
Scott Koskie

Soccer
Doug McMahon
Héctor Vergara, FIFA referee
Paul Fenwick
Marco Bustos
Kianz Froese
Desiree Scott

Others 

Amber Balcaen, racecar driver, first Canadian female to win a NASCAR race in the United States
Jamie Cudmore, rugby union player
Terry Fox, cancer activist and long-distance runner
Evelyn Goshawk, long jumper, first Manitoban woman to represent Canada in an international sports event
Norm Hadley, rugby union player
Joe Mazzucco, racecar driver
 Gordon Orlikow (b. 1960), decathlon, heptathlon, and hurdles competitor, Athletics Canada Chairman, Canadian Olympic Committee member, Korn/Ferry International partner
Rachel Riddell, water polo player
Michael Schmidt, ten-pin bowler
Bill Werbeniuk, snooker player
Teri York, diver

Business
Ida Albo, owner of the Fort Garry Hotel
Izzy Asper, founder of CanWest
David Asper, lawyer and co-founder of Amenity Healthcare Limited
Leonard Asper, CEO of Anthem Sports & Entertainment
Gail Asper, President of The Asper Foundation
George Montegu Black II, businessman, president of Canadian Breweries
Mark Chipman, owner of the Winnipeg Jets
Bill Comrie, founder of The Brick
Matthew Corrin, founder of Freshii
David Culver, chairman and CEO of Alcan
David Dreman, founder of Dreman Value Management
Sydney Halter, the first CFL Commissioner, Officer of the Order of Canada
F. Ross Johnson, former CEO of RJR Nabisco, featured in the book and film Barbarians at the Gate
Philip Kives, founder of K-tel
Jack Levit, real estate developer, CEO of Lakeview Management Inc.
John Draper Perrin, President of The Winnipeg Warriors Hockey Club
Peter Nygård, founder of Nygård International
James Armstrong Richardson, served as CEO of Richardson International
Irv Robbins, co-founder of Baskin-Robbins
Gerry Schwartz, founder and CEO of Onex Corporation
Andrew Strempler, served as president and CEO of Mediplan Health Consulting Inc
Bryan Turner, founder of Priority Records which signed artists like Snoop Dogg, Jay-Z and Ice Cube  
Lyle Wright, President of the Minneapolis Arena, United States Hockey Hall of Fame inductee

Journalists
 Ashleigh Banfield
 Rosemary Barton
 Rod Black
 Tyler Brûlé
 Jim Coleman
 John Wesley Dafoe
 Charles Edwards
 Dawna Friesen
 Bob Hunter
 Vince Leah
 Ken McKenzie
 Stewart MacPherson
 Ben Metcalfe
 Bob Moir
 Enid Nemy 
 Don Newman
 Scott Oake
 Catherine Seipp
 Hal Sigurdson
 Andrea Slobodian
 Maurice Smith
 Jeremy St. Louis
 Brian Williams
 Scott Young
 Larry Zolf

Musicians

Politicians

Film and television

Actors

Thom Allison
Ted Atherton
Cameron Bancroft
Robert Bockstael
Steve Braun
Jay Brazeau
Greg Bryk
Len Cariou
Doug Chapman
Jonas Chernick
Ari Cohen
Michael D. Cohen
Mychael Danna
Wallace Douglas
Brian Drader
Ed Evanko
Tibor Feheregyhazi
Brendan Fehr
Ken Finkleman
Daniel Gillies
Monty Hall
Joshua Henry
Tom Jackson
Robert Jeffrey
Gerald MacIntosh Johnston
Richard Kahan
Ryan Kennedy
Jack Kruschen
Jeremy Kushnier
Daniel Lavoie
Fletcher Markle
Paul Maxwell
Tom McCamus
Glen Meadmore
Lee Montgomery
Peter Mooney
Bob Nolan
John Paizs
Aleks Paunovic
Ross Petty
Douglas Rain
Donnelly Rhodes
 Kenny Robinson
Ron Rubin
Ted Rusoff
Jason Ruta
Kerry Shale
David Steinberg
Robert Tinkler
Adam Tsekhman
Kristopher Turner
Ryan Ward
Marshall Williams
Ty Wood

Actresses

Claire Adams
Julia Benson
Bif Naked
Martha Burns
Nancy Castiglione
Lisa Codrington
Heather Doerksen
Deanna Durbin
Melissa Elias
Ida Engel
Tamara Gorski
Dianne Heatherington
Tina Keeper
Chantal Kreviazuk
Mimi Kuzyk
Susan Leblanc
Carla Lehmann
Nadia Litz
Andrea Macasaet
Gisele MacKenzie
Mara Marini
Belinda Montgomery
Libby Morris
Brooke Palsson
Anna Paquin
Dorothy Patrick
Shirley Patterson
Jess Salgueiro
Pamela Mala Sinha
Tracy Spiridakos
Johanna Stein
Louriza Tronco
Charie Van Dyke
Nia Vardalos
Gwynyth Walsh
Marjorie White
Catherine Wreford

Military
 Leo Clarke
 Robert Cruickshank
 Frederick William Hall
 Coulson Norman Mitchell
 Andrew Charles Mynarski
 Walter Natynczyk
 Christopher O'Kelly
 Frank Pickersgill
 Jenny Pike
 H.L.N. Salmon
 Robert Shankland
 William Stephenson (known as "Intrepid")

Writers

Frank Albo
George Amabile
David Arnason
Joanne Arnott
Nahlah Ayed
Constance Backhouse
Marie Annharte Baker
Herbert Belyea
Margret Benedictsson
Sandra Birdsell
Salem Bland
Laurie Block
Patricia Blondal
Carol Bolt
Paulette Bourgeois
Marilyn Bowering
Ken Brand
Barbara Branden
Barry Broadfoot
Margaret Buffie
Tyler Clark Burke
Bonnie Burstow
Aaron Bushkowsky
Kristin Butcher
Alison Calder
Norman Cantor
Fern G. Z. Carr
Rick Chafe
Barry Chamish
Myriam J. A. Chancy
Catherine Chatterley
Jonas Chernick
Solomon Cleaver
Lisa Codrington
Jennifer Cohen
Lisa R. Cohen
Ruth Collie
Ralph Connor
Geoffrey Cornish
Andrew Coyne
Lorilee Craker
Anita Daher
William Arthur Deacon
Vicki Delany
David Demchuk
Muriel Denison
Kady MacDonald Denton
Michelle Desbarats
Grant Dexter
Olive Dickason
Nathan Divinsky
Kevin Doherty
Brian Drader
David Dreman
Dora Dueck
Jo-Ann Episkenew
Ernie Epp
Ian C. Esslemont
Danishka Esterhazy
Christine Fellows
Jon Paul Fiorentino
Valerie Fortney
Sean Garrity
Zsuzsi Gartner
Dave Godfrey
Suzanne Goldenberg
Noam Gonick
Allan Gotlieb
Sondra Gotlieb
George R. D. Goulet
Neile Graham
David Gratzer
Daniel Greaves 
Archie Green
Eric Gurney
Marilyn Hall
Rovin Hardy
 Anne Hart
Kaj Hasselriis
Ruth Heller
Tom Hendry
Joanne Hershfield
Pablo Hidalgo
John C. Higgins
Ella Cora Hind
Gerda Hnatyshyn
Linda Holeman
Chris Huebner
Jack Humphrey
Catherine Hunter
Stanley Jackson
Michael Kaan
Adeena Karasick
Guy Gavriel Kay
Diane Keating
John Keeble
Sandra Kirby
Jon Klassen
Sarah Klassen
Ken Kostick
Allan Kroeker
Robert Kroetsch
Margaret Laurence
Howard Leeds
Sylvia Legris
Cyril Edel Leonoff
Greg Leskiw
J. R. Léveillé
Benjamin Levin
Allan Levine
Diana Lindsay
Robert Linsley
Dorothy Livesay
Jack Ludwig
Jake MacDonald
Mary MacLane
Guy Maddin
Kuzhali Manickavel
Gilles Marchildon
Don Marks
John Marlyn
Bill Mason
Shirlee Matheson
Chandra Mayor
Kyle McCulloch
Robert McDonald
Brock McElheran
A. B. McKillop
Marshall McLuhan
Bobby McMahon
Maurice Mierau
Roy Miki
Earl Mindell
Susie Moloney
Pat Roy Mooney
Beatrice Mosionier
Michael Nathanson
Allan Novak
Sheldon Oberman
Patrick O’Connell
Carol Off
Jill Officer
Margo Oliver
Walt Patterson
Leonard Peikoff
Carol Philipps
Casey Plett
Laurent Poliquin
Jackie Rae
Lara Rae
Harry Rintoul
Thomas Beattie Roberton
David Robertson
Heather Robertson
Malcolm Ross
Gabrielle Roy
Jaroslav Rudnyckyj
Ted Rusoff
Alexei Maxim Russell
Frances Russell
Ed Russenholt
Laura Salverson
John K. Samson
David Secter
Patricia Alice Shaw
Carol Shields
Merilyn Simonds
Pamela Mala Sinha
Gwen Smid
Adam Smoluk
Don Starkell
Johanna Stein
Noreen Stevens
Margaret Sweatman
Astra Taylor
Wayne Tefs
J. Grant Thiessen
Vern Thiessen
Joan Thomas
Lillian Beynon Thomas
Clayton Thomas-Müller
Gwen Thompson
Robert Tinkler
Georgia Toews
Miriam Toews
Rhea Tregebov
Andrew Unger
W. D. Valgardson
Katherena Vermette
Armin Wiebe
Daniel Woolf

Scientists
G. Michael Bancroft, chemist and synchrotron scientist, first director of the Canadian Light Source
Velvl Greene
Jennifer Gunter
Doreen Kimura
Frances Gertrude McGill
Chris McKinstry
Alfred Needler
Jim Peebles
Louis Slotin
W. G. Unruh

References

 
Winnipeg
People
Winnipeg